Thion, Burkina Faso is a town in the Thion Department of Gnagna Province in eastern Burkina Faso. The town has a population of 3030 and it is the capital of the Thion Department.

References

Populated places in the Est Region (Burkina Faso)
Gnagna Province